Indre is a commune in the Loire-Atlantique department in western France.

Etymology
The name Indre, pronounced  in French, derives from that of Latin Antrum. The city was called Antrum and Antrinse monasterium in 840, Andra in 1144 was renamed Aindre and Indre.

The inhabitants of Indre are known in French as indrais .

Administration

Mayors

Population

Sights

See also
Communes of the Loire-Atlantique department

References

Communes of Loire-Atlantique